Goodbye Cruel World may refer to:

Music 
 Goodbye Cruel World (Elvis Costello album), an album by Elvis Costello and the Attractions
 Goodbye Cruel World (Custard album), an album by Custard
 Goodbye Cruel World, a 1999 album by Brutal Truth
 "Goodbye Cruel World" (James Darren song), a song by James Darren
 "Goodbye Cruel World" (Pink Floyd song), a song by Pink Floyd
 "Goodbye Cruel World" (Shakespears Sister song), a song by Shakespears Sister

Other uses 
 Goodbye Cruel World (TV series), a 1992 British drama starring Sue Johnston and Alum Armstrong

See also 
 Suicide note